This is a list of characters of the animated series SheZow.

Main characters

Guy Hamdon / SheZow

Voiced by: David-Myles Brown (Australian version) and Samuel Vincent (North American version)

SheZow is the alter-ego of Guy Eli Hamdon, a lovable and mischievous 12-year-old child who dislikes responsibility. Upon finding a magic ring that belonged to his late Aunt Agnes, the original SheZow, Guy is suddenly forced to save the world as the legendary female superheroine. When Guy wears the ring, he is granted super strength, speed, agility, empathy, a sonic scream, and an arsenal of crime-fighting gadgets. SheZow, thanks to Guy's natural look, is the most beautiful girl in the whole city: she wears a pink female superhero costume, complete with mascara, long ebony hair, high heeled boots, and a mini-dress. SheZow's weaknesses are her hair when it gets messed up or has a different hairstyle, wearing a different color besides pink (such as black), and health issues (when Guy gets sick, Shezow's powers malfunction).

SheZow's superpowers include the She-S-P (used whenever danger is behind the heroine), super strength and speed, a heavy handed Super She-Slap (SheZow's hand swells up and is able to smack the foe with great force), and a supersonic scream. In later episodes, the heroine would gain animal communication and flight, as well as the ability to time travel with the She-hicle.

SheZow carries weapons and tools inside her Beautility Belt to 
assist her cause in fighting crime. This includes vanishing cream which grants temporary invisibility, a lipstick which can be used as a laser sword, a hairbrush that turns into a boomerang, hairspray to fix SheZow's hair and regain her powers, and more.

Maz Kepler

Voiced by: Matt Hill

Guy's best friend, who loves to dress up as different sidekick costumes in every episode like Dan-o-flage, Bed Head, Nick of Time and Captain Debacle. His most well received outfit was his guise as Shaverine, a Wolverine lookalike who wielded electric shavers on his wrists, which accidentally turned super when they were struck with an electrical discharge.

Kelly Hamdon

Voiced by: Diana Kaarina

Guy's 12-year-old twin sister and the president of the International SheZow Fan Club, Kelly fancies herself an expert on all things "SheZow" and all things in general. She’s an adorable do-gooder who, for most of the series, is slightly bitter at her twin brother, because she thinks she was destined to become SheZow, until her twin brother snatched the Power Ring and her fate right out of the palm of her hand. However, a later episode reveals that her aunt wanted Guy to have the Power Ring all along. She's also one minute older than Guy and she loves to make fun of her brother, but she does anything for him or for SheZow.

Secondary characters

Sheila

A super-computer in the "She-Lair". AKA: "Sheila Supergraphic Supertronic 9000". She appears as a pair of giant pink lips on a monitor. She has a very witty personality and enjoys criticizing or making jokes at Guy's expense, but she is very fond to him and the new heroine. Sheila mentors Guy on how to properly be SheZow. Sheila may be a parody of Iron Man's JARVIS.

Rick the Brick

Guy and Maz's pet brick.

Officer Boxter Hamdon

Guy and Kelly's Dad, and a police officer on the beat who hates SheZow because she interferes with police work and she is capable to destroying everything in the city while she is fighting. Boxter does not know that his son is secretly SheZow.

Droosha Hamdon

Guy and Kelly's bongo-playing poetic Mom who adores SheZow. One episode (Momnesia) where she found out that her son is SheZow and she wanted to tell everyone about it. Kelly uses the crystal Glam-rock to erase her memory.

Officer Wackerman

Officer Boxter's dimwitted partner who likes She-Zow.

Brian Smirk

Ubiquitous (and obnoxious) Megadale TV newscaster/reporter, who's always "on the spot" when things happen to SheZow.

Wanda

A school newspaper reporter who is Kelly's best friend.

Alternate reality characters

Gal Hamdon / DudePow

DudePow, the alter ego of Gal Ellie Hamdon, is the male alternate version of SheZow. Gal is Guy's love interest, and the same goes for Shezow with Dudepow. Fortunately, the feeling is mutual in both couples, but they do not want to admit it. DudePow's deadly weakness is Destructionite (a parody of Kryptonite).

Kelli Hamdon

Gal's brother and Kelly's alternate reality version from another universe.

Maizy Kepler

Gal's best friend and Maz's alternate reality version from another universe.

Dudley

DudePow's super-computer and Sheila's alternate reality version from another universe.

Other characters

Agnes Monroe
Guy and Kelly's deceased great-aunt and the former SheZow. When she died she left her house to the Hamdon family, passed the SheZow mantle down to Guy.

Agnes was working as SheZow as early as 1952, and continued until her death.

Agnes established herself as Megadale's main hero, and for most of her career had the same costume, powers, and weaknesses that Guy currently has. Her international fan club, villains, and SheZow products were passed down to Guy, as everyone believes he is still Agnes.

Her fame drove her former friend Tara to eventual villainy and joined the S.I.C.K.

In the episode Guy & Doll, Agnes appears as a nurse, when she helps Guy facing his fear in a real and unreal dream.

In Supernatural History, Agnes briefly returns and reveals that she'd always intended for Guy to inherit her power ring because he thinks like a villain and he's innovative. She wanted Kelly to be Guy's organizer and keeps the new heroine in check.

Buff Buddy
A SuperHero with extending, super strong armpit hair, and a member of Xselsior.

Caped Koala
A super koala that fights crime.

Captain XL
An Obese SuperHero with sizeable girth & strength, and a member of Xselsior.

Crash Thunder
Guy and Maz's favorite pro-wrestler with the fear of nothing but trolls.

Mrs. Creature
Guy's teacher who happens to dislike Kelly .

Geek Sheik
A Geek SuperHero with control over technology, and a member of Xselsior.

Glint Eastwood
A SuperHero with the ability to mesmerize, and a leader of Xselsior.

Uma Thermal
A SuperHeroine with pyrotechnic powers, and A key member of the Superhero Action Guild. She is jealous of Shezow.

Antagonists

Aliens

Highly intelligent, slug-like aliens. They use the Earth's trash scraps to create powerful weapons.

Aristotle Eptihew III
An egocentric billionaire who collected endangered species as a hobby and kept them in small cages.

Baby Scarington

A combination of Guy's fears, that plunges him and Shezow between real and unreal to face her.

Big Chow Slim

An obese, underworld mob boss, the number one employer of all ninjas.

Brouhaha

A fox clown, who was imprisoned by the previous SheZow in a vacuum cleaner but accidentally released. He becomes dangerously angry when others don't laugh at his jokes.

Candy Rapper

A rap candy, a member of S.I.C.K. (the Society of Incredibly Callous Kriminals).

Cold Finger

An ice boy with a childish character, who live with his mother AKA, "Timmy Isaiah Brrrstein". He appears to be a parody of Iceman, bearing very similar powers, and just like him is made from living ice. His name is a play on that of James Bond Villain Goldfinger. He was originally SheZow's biggest fan but felt betrayed one time and turned to villainy.

Count Pussenbite

A vampire cat and the main villain of the vampire hunter video game. His name is played on Puss in Boots and Count Dracula.

Dr. Frankenweather

A former Megadale TV weatherman, who's obsessed with controlling the weather in order to control the world.

Evil Park Ranger
A park ranger who exploited Shesquatch to pretend to attack campers in order to make his park famous for Bigfoot sightings.

Fibberachee

A rock star who's jealous of SheZow's popularity, and turns his audience into zombies in an effort to eliminate her, He also appears as a cameo in the episode Hot Rocks when he was one of the three judges.

Grilla

DudePow's main villain, and Cold Finger's alternate reality version from another universe.

Le Pigeon

A pigeon, mutated by toxic waste, who fights for the rights of birds.

Little Moochers

A trio of diminutive thieves from the shrill voice

Madame Curiador

The crazy woman of the Museum of Supernatural History, who seeks to add SheZow's ring to her collection.

Major Attitude

An ex-military officer, ashamed of his silly, high-pitched voice.

Manny Ken

A giant shop mannequin, who is obsessed with his clothing.

Mega Monkey

A genetically enhanced monkey from the future, whose ultimate goal is to enslave the world; he is the leader of S.I.C.K.

Mister Cylinder

An Auto-Theft criminal, who stole the Glam-Rock from the She-hicle.

Mocktopus

A sea monster (part shark, part octopus and part stingray) with mother issues. He is a member of S.I.C.K. and has a very sarcastic attitude.

Null & Void
A brother/sister team of exchange students who turned out to be highly powerful supers who came to defeat SheZow because they were bored after defeating all superheroes in their home country.

Periwinkle

The evil nephew of Sherry, the Tooth Fairy. He tried to steal the money reserved for those rewarded for putting teeth under their pillows.

Pushy Pirate Posse

Pirates who steal from video stores and baby clothing stores (where they seek 'booties').

Señor Yo-Yo

A Spanish villain who uses yo-yos as weapons. He is a member of S.I.C.K. although is viewed with derision by the other supervillains.

SheZap

SheZow's evil clone, created from one of her discarded fingernails, combined with toxic waste. She loves annoy her "mother" by provoking her and challenging her to a duel. She is identical to Shezow, but she is dressed in green and black, her skin is greenish, her voice is shrill and her colored lock of hair is green.

Spit Bubble

A member of the S.I.C.K., he can create giant, destructive spit-bubbles with his saliva.

Tara

Aunt Agnes' ex-friend, but after SheZow became more famous and popular than her, she became the main villain, joined the S.I.C.K and vowed to destroy her.

Tattoozala

The world's oldest tattoo artist, who was arrested for graffiti painting all over town since he was a child.

See also 
 List of SheZow episodes

External links
Character list at the SheZow website

Lists of characters in Australian television animation
Lists of characters in Canadian television animation
Lists of superheroes